In computer science a doubly logarithmic tree is a tree where each internal node of height 1, the tree layer above the leaves, has two children, and each internal node of height  has  children. Each child of the root contains  leaves. The number of children at a node as we go from leaf to root is 0,2,2,4,16, 256, 65536, ... 

A similar tree called a k-merger is used in Prokop et al.'s cache oblivious Funnelsort to merge elements.

Notes

References
.
Harald Prokop. Cache-Oblivious Algorithms. Masters thesis, MIT. 1999.
M. Frigo, C.E. Leiserson, H. Prokop, and S. Ramachandran. Cache-oblivious algorithms. In Proceedings of the 40th IEEE Symposium on Foundations of Computer Science (FOCS 99), p. 285-297. 1999. Extended abstract at IEEE, at Citeseer.
Erik Demaine. Review of the Cache-Oblivious Sorting. Notes for MIT Computer Science 6.897: Advanced Data Structures.

Trees (data structures)